Hilary Stacy Jaén Rodríguez (born 29 August 2002) is a Panamanian footballer who plays as a defender for the Panama women's national team. She is nicknamed Hilareta.

International career
Jaén appeared in four matches for Panama at the 2018 CONCACAF Women's Championship.

See also
 List of Panama women's international footballers

References

2002 births
Living people
People from Chepo District
Panamanian women's footballers
Women's association football defenders
Tauro F.C. players
Panama women's international footballers
Pan American Games competitors for Panama
Footballers at the 2019 Pan American Games
South Alabama Jaguars women's soccer players